Josephus Wakefield was a member of the Wisconsin State Assembly.

Biography
Wakefield was born on October 10, 1819. He died on April 14, 1901.

Career
Wakefield was a member of the Assembly in 1882. Other positions he held include Postmaster of Medina, Outagamie County, Wisconsin, member of the Board of Supervisors of Outagamie County, Wisconsin and District Attorney of Waupaca County, Wisconsin. He was a Republican.

References

People from Medina, Outagamie County, Wisconsin
People from Waupaca County, Wisconsin
Republican Party members of the Wisconsin State Assembly
County supervisors in Wisconsin
District attorneys in Wisconsin
Wisconsin postmasters
1819 births
1901 deaths
19th-century American politicians